Toni Hassan (born 1972) is an Australian journalist, a writer with an interest in contemporary social issues, and emerging artist who works predominantly in painting.

Biography 
Hassan was born in South Africa, settling in Australia with her parents in the late 1970s. She attended Sydney Mackellar Girls High and completed a Bachelor of Arts, Communication at Charles Sturt University, before pursuing a career as a journalist with the Australian Broadcasting Corporation, The Canberra Times, Fairfax Media and Nine Newspapers.

In 2001 she was awarded a Walkley Award for her radio documentary "The Health of Asylum Seekers in Detention". Broadcast as part of the ABC's Health Report, Hassan explored the services available to asylum seekers and the implications of long-term detention. Hassan was also awarded a Human Rights Media Award by the Australian Human Rights Commission for excellence in journalism.

Hassan is an Adjunct Research Fellow with the Australian Centre for Christianity and Culture, Charles Sturt University. She is well-known for her ongoing interest in community development, government policy and human rights and contributes to the online public policy journal Pearls and Irritations.

Hassan is an emerging artist: her work has been influenced by her early years living in South Africa during the Soweto Riots, as well as ongoing issues of human trafficking and social justice. Hassan's social art practice can be seen as "an intersection of the secular and the sacred".

In 2018, she was awarded the ACT Legislative Assembly's Speaker's Emerging Artists Support Scheme Award (EASS). Her painting "Shifting ground and King Billy" is now in the collection of the Legislative Assembly of the ACT. The acrylic paintings depicts a "Wiradjuri man, Jimmy Clements, who walked for nearly a week to attend the opening of Australia's Federal Parliament in 1923" and the image is described as "being immediately recognisable as a reflection on race and power".

Her book, Families in the digital age, was highly commended in the Nonfiction section of the 2020 ACT Writing and Publishing Awards.

Education 
 1990–1993, Bachelor of Arts, Communication, Charles Sturt University
 2015–2018, Bachelor of Visual Arts, The Australian National University

Publications

Exhibitions 
 2021  "Together alone", Canberra Contemporary Art Space, Manuka
 2020  "Stations of the Cross", Northmead Creative and Performing Arts High School, Northmead, NSW
 2020  Fisher's Ghost Art Award, Campbelltown Arts Centre, Campbelltown, NSW
 2018  "Alone together", ACT Legislative Assembly, Canberra

Personal 
Hassan is married to economist, journalist and commentator Peter Martin AM.

References

External links 
 "Shifting ground and King Billy", Legislative Assembly of ACT Collection

1972 births
Living people
Charles Sturt University alumni
Australian women journalists
South African journalists
South African women journalists
21st-century Australian women artists
Australian National University alumni
South African emigrants to Australia
ABC radio (Australia) journalists and presenters
Walkley Award winners
Australian painters
South African painters
Australian women painters
South African women painters
21st-century Australian painters
21st-century South African painters
21st-century South African women artists
21st-century Australian journalists